Brenda Shanahan is an Irish businesswoman. She won the first series of the Irish version of The Apprentice TV show. She is one of the only candidates in any of the world versions of the show to have won 10 out of 11 tasks set for participants in the show, aside Helen in season 7 of the UK version. She now works for the central personality of the show, Bill Cullen.

Shanahan grew up in Galway and lived in Limerick for some years. She is a former acrobatic gymnast, having won several competitions in the sport. She started her working life as a hotel receptionist in Galway. From there, she moved to Dublin, where she worked for some years with a mobile phone operator. She became the company's business development executive. After this, Shanahan decided to start her own business, opening a bridal shop in Cork that she still owns today. Shanahan has now moved to live in Dublin, working alongside The Apprentice boss, Bill Cullen. As a result of winning the show, Shanahan has an annual salary of €100,000.

References

Year of birth missing (living people)
Living people
21st-century Irish businesswomen
People from Galway (city)
The Apprentice (Irish TV series) candidates
The Apprentice (franchise) winners